Battling may refer to:

 Battle, a combat in warfare
 Battling Billson, a 1923 short stories character by P. G. Wodehouse
 Battling Levinsky, an American world champion light heavyweight boxer
 Battling Nelson, a Danish world champion lightweight champion boxer 
 Battling Shaw, a Mexican world champion light welterweight boxer
 Battling Siki, a French light heavyweight boxer